The Pamir Mountains are a mountain range between Central Asia and Pakistan. It is located at a junction with other notable mountains, namely the Tian Shan, Karakoram, Kunlun, Hindu Kush and the Himalaya mountain ranges. They are among the world's highest mountains.

Much of the Pamir Mountains lie in the Gorno-Badakhshan Province of Tajikistan. To the south, they border the Hindu Kush mountains along Afghanistan's Wakhan Corridor in Badakhshan Province, Chitral and Gilgit-Baltistan regions of Pakistan. To the north, they join the Tian Shan mountains along the Alay Valley of Kyrgyzstan. To the east, they extend to the range that includes China's Kongur Tagh, in the "Eastern Pamirs", separated by the Yarkand valley from the Kunlun Mountains.

Since Victorian times, they have been known as the "Roof of the World", presumably a translation from Persian.

Names and etymology 

"Pamir" 
According to Middleton and Thomas, "pamir" is a geological term. A pamir is a flat plateau or U-shaped valley surrounded by mountains. It forms when a glacier or ice field melts leaving a rocky plain. A pamir lasts until erosion forms soil and cuts down normal valleys. This type of terrain is found in the east and north of the Wakhan, and the east and south of Gorno-Badakhshan, as opposed to the valleys and gorges of the west. Pamirs are used for summer pasture.

The Great Pamir is around Lake Zorkul. The Little Pamir is east of this in the far east of Wakhan. The Taghdumbash Pamir is between Tashkurgan and the Wakhan west of the Karakoram Highway. The Alichur Pamir is around Yashil Kul on the Gunt River. The Sarez Pamir is around the town of Murghab, Tajikistan. The Khargush Pamir is south of Lake Karakul. There are several others.

The Pamir River is in the south-west of the Pamirs.

Geography

Mountain 
The three highest mountains in the Pamirs core are Ismoil Somoni Peak (known from 1932 to 1962 as Stalin Peak, and from 1962 to 1998 as Communism Peak), ; Ibn Sina Peak (still unofficially known as Lenin Peak), ; and Peak Korzhenevskaya (Pik Korzhenevskoi), .

Among the significant peaks of the Pamir Mountains are the following:

Remark: The summits of the Kongur and Muztagata Group are in some sources counted as part of the Kunlun, which would make Pik Ismoil Somoni the highest summit of the Pamir.

Glaciers 
Approximately 12,500 km2 (ca. 10%) of the Pamirs are glaciated. Glaciers in the Southern Pamirs are retreating rapidly. Ten percent of annual runoff is supposed to originate from retreating glaciers in the Southern Pamirs. In the North-Western Pamirs, glaciers have almost stable mass balances.

Climate 

Covered in snow during most of the year, the Pamirs have long and bitterly cold winters, and short, cool summers, which equals an ET (tundra climate) according to Köppen climate classification (EF above the snow line).

Paleoclimatology during the Ice Age 
The East-Pamir, in the centre of which the massifs of Mustagh Ata (7620 m) and Kongur Tagh (Qungur Shan, 7578, 7628 or 7830 m) are situated, shows from the western margin of the Tarim Basin an east–west extension of c. 200 km. Its north–south extension from King Ata Tagh up to the northwest Kunlun foothills amounts to c.170 km. Whilst the up to 21 km long current valley glaciers are restricted to mountain massifs exceeding 5600 m in height, during the last glacial period the glacier ice covered the high plateau with its set-up highland relief, continuing west of Mustagh Ata and Kongur. From this glacier area an outlet glacier has flowed down to the north-east through the Gez valley up to c.1850 m asl (meters above sea level) and thus as far as to the margin of the Tarim basin. This outlet glacier received inflow from the Kaiayayilak glacier from the Kongur north flank. From the north-adjacent Kara Bak Tor (Chakragil, c. 6800 or 6694 m) massif, the Oytag valley glacier in the same exposition flowed also down up to c. 1850 m asl. At glacial times the glacier snowline
(ELA) as altitude limit between glacier nourishing area and ablation zone, was about 820 to 1250 metres lower than it is today. Under the condition of comparable proportions of precipitation there results from this a glacial depression of temperature of at least 5 to 7.5 °C.

Economy 
Coal is mined in the west, though sheep herding in upper meadowlands is the primary source of income for the region.

Exploration 

The lapis lazuli found in Egyptian tombs is thought to come from the Pamir area in Badakhshan province of Afghanistan.  About 138 BCE Zhang Qian reached the Fergana Valley northwest of the Pamirs. Ptolemy vaguely describes a trade route through the area. From about 600 CE, Buddhist pilgrims travelled on both sides of the Pamirs to reach India from China. In 747 a Tang army was on the Wakhan River. There are various Arab and Chinese reports. Marco Polo may have travelled along the Panj River. In 1602 Bento de Goes travelled from Kabul to Yarkand and left a meager report on the Pamirs. In 1838 Lieutenant John Wood reached the headwaters of the Pamir River. From about 1868 to 1880, a number of Indians in the British service secretly explored the Panj area. In 1873 the British and Russians agreed to an Afghan frontier along the Panj River. From 1871 to around 1893 several Russian military-scientific expeditions mapped out most of the Pamirs (Alexei Pavlovich Fedchenko, Nikolai Severtzov, Captain Putyata and others. Later came Nikolai Korzhenevskiy). Several local groups asked for Russian protection from Afghan raiders. The Russians were followed by a number of non-Russians including Ney Elias, George Littledale, the Earl of Dunmore, Wilhelm Filchner and Lord Curzon who was probably the first to reach the Wakhan source of the Oxus River. In 1891 the Russians informed Francis Younghusband that he was on their territory and later escorted a Lieutenant Davidson out of the area ('Pamir Incident'). In 1892 a battalion of Russians under Mikhail Ionov entered the area and camped near the present Murghab. In 1893 they built a proper fort there (Pamirskiy Post).  In 1895 their base was moved to Khorog facing the Afghans.

In 1928 the last blank areas around the Fedchenko Glacier were mapped by a German-Soviet expedition under Willi Rickmer Rickmers.

Discoveries 
In the early 1980s, a deposit of gemstone-quality clinohumite was discovered in the Pamir Mountains. It was the only such deposit known until the discovery of gem-quality material in the Taymyr region of Siberia, in 2000.

The earliest known evidence of human cannabis use was found in tombs at the Jirzankal Cemetery.

Transport 

The Pamir Highway, the world's second highest international road, runs from Dushanbe in Tajikistan to Osh in Kyrgyzstan through the Gorno-Badakhshan Autonomous Province, and is the isolated region's main supply route. The Great Silk Road crossed a number of Pamir Mountain ranges.

Tourism 
In December 2009, the New York Times featured articles on the possibilities for tourism in the Pamir area of Tajikistan. 2013 proved to be the most successful year ever for tourism in the region and tourism development continues to be the fastest growing economic sector. The META (Murghab Ecotourism Association) website (www.meta.tj) provides an excellent repository of tourism related resources for the Eastern Pamir region.

Strategic position 

Historically, the Pamir Mountains were considered a strategic trade route between Kashgar and Kokand on the Northern Silk Road, a prehistoric trackway, and have been subject to numerous territorial conquests. In the 20th century, they have been the setting for Tajikistan Civil War, border disputes between China and Soviet Union, establishment of US, Russian, and Indian military bases, and renewed interest in trade development and resource exploration. China has since resolved most of those disputes with Central Asian countries.

Religious symbolism 

Some researchers identify the Pamirs with the Mount Meru or Sumeru. The Mount Meru is the sacred five-peaked mountain of  Buddhist, Jain, and Hindu cosmology and is considered to be the center of all the physical, metaphysical and spiritual universes.

See also 

 Pamir National Park
 Pamir languages
 List of mountain ranges
 List of highest mountains
 Soviet Central Asia
 Central Asia
 Mount Imeon
 Ak-Baital Pass
 China–Tajikistan border
 Chalachigu Valley

Notes

References

Further reading 

 Leitner, G. W. (1890). Dardistan in 1866, 1886 and 1893: Being an Account of the History, Religions, Customs, Legends, Fables and Songs of Gilgit, Chilas, Kandia (Gabrial) Yasin, Chitral, Hunza, Nagyr and other parts of the Hindukush. With a supplement to the second edition of The Hunza and Nagyr Handbook. And an Epitome of Part III of the author's “The Languages and Races of Dardistan”. First Reprint 1978. Manjusri Publishing House, New Delhi.
 Murray, Charles (1894). The Pamirs; being a narrative of a year's expedition on horseback and on foot through Kashmir, western Tibet, Chinese Tartary, and Russian Central Asia. J. Murray. (Vol. I and II)
 Curzon, George Nathaniel. (1896). The Pamirs and the Source of the Oxus. Royal Geographical Society, London. Reprint: Elibron Classics Series, Adamant Media Corporation. 2005.  (pbk;  (hbk).
 Wood, John, (1872). A Journey to the Source of the River Oxus. With an essay on the Geography of the Valley of the Oxus by Colonel Henry Yule. London: John Murray.
 Gordon, T. E. (1876). The Roof of the World: Being the Narrative of a Journey over the high plateau of Tibet to the Russian Frontier and the Oxus sources on Pamir. Edinburgh. Edmonston and Douglas. Reprint by Ch’eng Wen Publishing Company. Taipei. 1971.
 Cobbold, Ralph Patteson (1900). Innermost Asia: travel & sport in the Pamirs. W. Heinemann.
 Strong, Anna Louise. (1930). The Road to the Grey Pamir. Robert M. McBride & Co., New York.
 Toynbee, Arnold J. (1961). Between Oxus and Jumna. London. Oxford University Press.
 Slesser, Malcolm (1964). Red Peak: A Personal Account of the British-Soviet Expedition. Coward McCann.
 Wang, Miao (1983). From the Pamirs to Beijing : tracing Marco Polo's northern route. HK China Tourism Press.
 Tilman, H. W. (1983). "Two Mountains and a River" part of The Severn Mountain Travel Books. Diadem, London. 
 Waugh, Daniel C. (1999). "The ‘Mysterious and Terrible Karatash Gorges’: Notes and Documents on the Explorations by Stein and Skrine." The Geographical Journal, Vol. 165, No. 3. (Nov., 1999), pp. 306–320.
 Horsman, S. (2002). Peaks, Politics and Purges: the First Ascent of Pik Stalin in Douglas, E. (ed.) Alpine Journal 2002 (Volume 107), The Alpine Club & Ernest Press, London, pp 199–206.
 Gecko-Maps (2004). The Pamirs. 1:500.000 – A tourist map of Gorno-Badkshan-Tajikistan and background information on the region. Verlag "Gecko-Maps", Switzerland 
 Dagiev, Dagikhudo, and Carole Faucher, eds. (2018). Identity, History and Trans-nationality in Central Asia: The Mountain Communities of Pamir. Routledge.

External links 

 Life in Afghanistan's Pamir mountains
 Information and photos
 Afghan's Little Pamir – photos of the life of ethnic Kyrgyz

 
Landforms of Central Asia
Mountain ranges of Asia
Mountain ranges of China
Mountain ranges of Afghanistan
Mountain ranges of Pakistan
Mountain ranges of Tajikistan
Mountain ranges of Kyrgyzstan
Physiographic provinces
Landforms of Badakhshan Province